Dufy may refer to:

 Jean Dufy
 Raoul Dufy

See also
 Duffy (disambiguation)